Thanniyam  is a village in Thrissur district in the state of Kerala, India.

Demographics
 India census, Thanniyam had a population of 8,449 with 3,893 males and 4,556 females.

References

Villages in Thrissur district